Carlos Adsera (born 6 March 1946) is a Spanish alpine skier. He competed in the 1968 Winter Olympics.

References

1946 births
Living people
Alpine skiers at the 1968 Winter Olympics
Spanish male alpine skiers
Olympic alpine skiers of Spain
Sportspeople from Burgos
20th-century Spanish people